Bill Hyde is a former American football player and coach.  He served as the head football coach at the University of North Alabama from 1998 to 2001.

Head coaching record

References

Year of birth missing (living people)
Living people
American football quarterbacks
Delta State Statesmen football coaches
Itawamba Indians football players
North Alabama Lions football coaches
Samford Bulldogs football coaches
Valdosta State Blazers football coaches
Junior college football players in the United States